Lycée Michelet may refer to one of several French high schools/sixth form colleges named after Jules Michelet:
 Lycée Michelet (Brive-la-Gaillarde), Brive-la-Gaillarde, Corrèze
 Lycée Michelet (Lannemezan), Lannemezan, Hautes-Pyrénées
 Lycée Michelet (Marseille), Marseille, Bouches-du-Rhône
 , Montauban, Tarn-et-Garonne
 Lycée Michelet (Nantes), Nantes, Loire-Atlantique
 , Nice, Alpes-Maritimes
 Lycée Michelet (Vanves), Vanves, Hauts-de-Seine